The Szemerédi–Trotter theorem is a mathematical result in the field of Discrete geometry. It asserts that given   points and  lines in the Euclidean plane, the number of incidences (i.e., the number of point-line pairs, such that the point lies on the line) is

This bound cannot be improved, except in terms of the implicit constants.

As for the implicit constants, it was shown by János Pach, Radoš Radoičić, Gábor Tardos, and Géza Tóth that the upper bound  holds. Since then better constants are known due to better crossing lemma constants; the current best is 2.44. On the other hand, Pach and Tóth showed that the statement does not hold true if one replaces the coefficient 2.5 with 0.42.

An equivalent formulation of the theorem is the following. Given   points and an integer , the number of lines which pass through at least  of the points is

The original proof of Endre Szemerédi and William T. Trotter was somewhat complicated, using a combinatorial technique known as cell decomposition.  Later, László Székely discovered a much simpler proof using the crossing number inequality for graphs. (See below.)

The Szemerédi–Trotter theorem has a number of consequences, including Beck's theorem in incidence geometry and the Erdős-Szemerédi sum-product problem in additive combinatorics.

Proof of the first formulation 
We may discard the lines which contain two or fewer of the points, as they can contribute at most  incidences to the total number. Thus we may assume that every line contains at least three of the points.

If a line contains  points, then it will contain  line segments which connect two consecutive points along the line. Because  after discarding the two-point lines, it follows that , so the number of these line segments on each line is at least half the number of incidences on that line. Summing over all of the lines, the number of these line segments is again at least half the total number of incidences. Thus if  denotes the number of such line segments, it will suffice to show that

Now consider the graph formed by using the   points as vertices, and the  line segments as edges. Since each line segment lies on one of  lines, and any two lines intersect in at most one point, the crossing number of this graph is at most the number of points where two lines intersect, which is at most . The crossing number inequality implies that either , or that . In either case , giving the desired bound

Proof of the second formulation 
This bound will prove the theorem when  is small (e.g. if  for some absolute constant ). Thus, we need only consider the case when  is large, say .

Suppose that there are m lines that each contain at least  points. These lines generate at least  incidences, and so by the first formulation of the Szemerédi–Trotter theorem, we have

The third possibility is ruled out since  was assumed to be large, so we are left with the first two. But in either of these two cases, some elementary algebra will give the bound  as desired.

Optimality 
Except for its constant, the Szemerédi–Trotter incidence bound cannot be improved. To see this, consider for any positive integer  a set of points on the integer lattice

and a set of lines

Generalization to  
One generalization of this result to arbitrary dimension, was found by Agarwal and Aronov.

Equivalently, the number of hyperplanes in  containing   or more points is bounded above by

A construction due to Edelsbrunner shows this bound to be asymptotically optimal.

József Solymosi and Terence Tao obtained near sharp upper bounds for the number of incidences between points and algebraic varieties in higher dimensions, when the points and varieties satisfy "certain pseudo-line type axioms". Their proof uses the Polynomial Ham Sandwich Theorem.

In  
Many proofs of the Szemerédi–Trotter theorem over  rely in a crucial way on the topology of Euclidean space, so do not extend easily to other fields. e.g. the original proof of Szemerédi and Trotter; the polynomial partitioning proof and the crossing number proof do not extend to the complex plane.

Tóth successfully generalized the original proof of Szemerédi and Trotter to the complex plane  by introducing additional ideas. This result was also obtained independently and through a different method by Zahl. The implicit constant in the bound is not the same in the complex numbers: in Tóth's proof the constant can be taken to be ; the constant is not explicit in Zahl's proof.

When the point set is a Cartesian product, Solymosi and Tardos show that the Szemerédi-Trotter bound holds using a much simpler argument.

In finite fields 
Let  be a field.

A Szemerédi-Trotter bound is impossible in general due to the following example, stated here in : let  be the set of all  points and let  be the set of all  lines in the plane. Since each line contains  points, there are  incidences. On the other hand, a Szemerédi-Trotter bound would give  incidences. This example shows that the trivial, combinatorial incidence bound is tight.

Bourgain, Katz and Tao show that if this example is excluded, then an incidence bound that is an improvement on the trivial bound can be attained.

Incidence bounds over finite fields are of two types: (i) when at least one of the set of points or lines is `large' in terms of the characteristic of the field; (ii) both the set of points and the set of lines are `small' in terms of the characteristic.

Large set incidence bounds 
Let  be an odd prime power.

Note that there is no implicit constant in this bound.

Small set incidence bounds 
Let  be a field of characteristic .

under the condition  in positive characteristic. (In a field of characteristic zero, this condition is not necessary.) This bound is better than the trivial incidence estimate when .

Suppose that  and in positive characteristic that .

This bound is optimal. Note that by point-line duality in the plane, this incidence bound can be rephrased for an arbitrary point set and a set of lines having a Cartesian product structure.

In both the reals and arbitrary fields, Rudnev and Shkredov show an incidence bound for when both the point set and the line set has a Cartesian product structure. This is sometimes better than the above bounds.

References 

Euclidean plane geometry
Theorems in discrete geometry
Theorems in combinatorics
Articles containing proofs